MJC is a short form which may refer to: 
 
Modesto Junior College, in Modesto, California, USA
Meridian Junior College, in Singapore
Muslim Judicial Council, in South Africa
An abbreviation of Military Junior College
Multinational Joint Commission, a Western effort to help the Ukraine